Wujuh al-Hajar (also spelled Woojeh al-Hajjar) is a village in western Syria, administratively part of the Homs Governorate, southwest of Homs. It is situated near the border with Lebanon to the south, and nearby localities include Khirbet al-Ghazi to the northeast and Laftaya to the northwest. According to the Central Bureau of Statistics (CBS), Wujuh al-Hajar had a population of 831 in the 2004 census.

References

Populated places in Homs District